Charles Barry Weitzenberg (born September 30, 1946, in Palo Alto, California) is a former water polo player from the United States, who was a member of the American Men's Team that won the bronze medal at the 1972 Summer Olympics in Munich, West Germany. In 1984, he was inducted into the USA Water Polo Hall of Fame.

See also
 List of Olympic medalists in water polo (men)

References

External links
 
 Barry Weitzenberg at JewsInSports.org

1946 births
Living people
American male water polo players
Water polo players at the 1968 Summer Olympics
Water polo players at the 1972 Summer Olympics
Olympic bronze medalists for the United States in water polo
Medalists at the 1972 Summer Olympics